Miller Comprehensive Catholic High School is a Catholic high school located in the Core Group neighbourhood in the central area of Regina, Saskatchewan, Canada. It was the first high school built by the Regina Catholic school system. It is named after Joseph P. Miller who was a longtime member of the school board.

Miller offers several academic and extracurricular opportunities to its students, including an Advanced Placement (AP) program, a regular program, as well as a modified alternative academic program. The AP courses offered at Miller are: Calculus, English, Computer Science, Psychology and Studio Art. A number of specialized courses, including automotive, baking, commercial cooking, construction, cosmetology and welding are also available.

Its feeder elementary schools include Jean Vanier School, St. Augustine Community School, St. Catherine Community School, St. Dominic Savio School, St. Gabriel School, St. Marguerite Bourgeoys School, St. Theresa School, and École St. Elizabeth School.

Clubs 
Miller offers the following clubs and activities:
 AV Tech
 Automotive Club
 Beading Club
 Book Club
 Chess Club
 Cooking Club
 Crochet Club
 Drumming Group
 Musical 
 One Acts
 Outdoor Ed
 Improv
 Knitting Club
 Robotics Club
 SADD (Students Against Distracted Driving)
 Liturgical Team
 Maker Space Club
 Multicultural Club
 Revelation (Liturgical Music Group)
 Student Representative Council (SRC) 
 Unity in Diversity
 We All Matter (WAM)
 Yearbook

Student Representative Council 

The Student Representative Council (SRC) at Miller Comprehensive High School is responsible for student activities such as: Welcome Week, pep rallies, activity days and game shows.

Sports
Miller Comprehensive High School hosts the following sports teams:
Badminton
Basketball
Cross country
Curling
Football
Fencing
Golf
Hockey
Ping pong
Rugby union
Soccer
Track and field
Volleyball
Wrestling

Notable alumni

John Donnelly, bassist and vocalist of the Queen City Kids
Christine Tell, politician
Denise Batters, politician, Senator 
Josh Harding, NHL goaltender for the Minnesota Wild
David Plummer, software engineer on MS-DOS and Microsoft Windows, author of Task Manager in Windows, Space Cadet pinball Windows NT port, etc.
Brett Wade, CFL Defensive Tackle for the Hamilton Tiger-Cats

Affiliated communities
Al Ritchie
Arcola East - North 
Arcola East - South
Boothill
Cathedral
Core Group 
Gladmer Park 
Glencairn 
Glenelm

References

External links
Miller Comprehensive High School

High schools in Regina, Saskatchewan
Catholic secondary schools in Saskatchewan
Educational institutions established in 1966
1966 establishments in Saskatchewan